Yagnier Hernández (born May 14, 1983 in Camagüey) is an amateur Cuban Greco-Roman wrestler, who played for the men's featherweight category. He won a gold medal for his division at the 2007 Pan American Games in Rio de Janeiro, Brazil, defeating Venezuela's Jorge Cardozo.

Hernandez represented Cuba at the 2008 Summer Olympics in Beijing, where he competed for the men's 55 kg class. He first defeated North Korea's Cha Kwang-Su in the preliminary round of sixteen, before losing out the quarterfinal match to Azerbaijan's Rovshan Bayramov, with a three-set technical score (0–5, 2–1, 0–4), and a classification point score of 1–3. Because his opponent advanced further into the final match, Hernandez offered another shot for the bronze medal by defeating Egypt's Mostafa Mohamed in the repechage rounds. He progressed to the bronze medal match, but narrowly lost the medal to Armenia's Roman Amoyan, with a technical score of 0–8.

References

External links
Profile – International Wrestling Database
NBC 2008 Olympics profile

1983 births
Wrestlers at the 2007 Pan American Games
Pan American Games gold medalists for Cuba
Wrestlers at the 2008 Summer Olympics
Olympic wrestlers of Cuba
Sportspeople from Camagüey
Living people
Cuban male sport wrestlers
Pan American Games medalists in wrestling
Medalists at the 2007 Pan American Games
20th-century Cuban people
21st-century Cuban people